Miguel Ángel Ochoa (born 29 September 1944) is a Spanish footballer. He competed in the men's tournament at the 1968 Summer Olympics.

References

External links
 
 

1944 births
Living people
Footballers from Extremadura
Spanish footballers
Spain international footballers
Olympic footballers of Spain
Footballers at the 1968 Summer Olympics
Sportspeople from Badajoz
Association football defenders
RCD Espanyol footballers
La Liga players
Tercera División players
Catalonia international guest footballers